Pride of Performance (Urdu: تمغۂ حسنِ کارکردگی) is a civil award given by the government of Pakistan to Pakistani citizens in recognition of distinguished merit in the fields of literature, arts, sports, medicine, or science for civilians.

1957

1958

1959

References